The Sharp Aquos is a product brand name for LCD televisions and component screens, originally sold by Sharp Corporation of Japan and also used by licensees.

History 
It encompasses small, portable models (e.g. the 13" B series) up to large home-theater screens (e.g. 65" high-definition widescreen models), as well as component screens for portable devices including mobile phones. Aquos was first released in 2001 with 13", 15", and 20" 4:3 sizes starting, pricing at $1,799.99, $2,999.99, and $4,999.99 respectively. Since then, the Aquos brand is Sharp's premium LCD line (as Sharp also makes non-Aquos LCD TVs that sell for less), and recently they have been the first series of LCD HDTVs to feature integrated Blu-ray Disc players with the BD-60U and BD-80U series debuting in 2009. Some Aquos LCD TVs are notable for displaying color in a RYGB color space known as Quattron, which adds a yellow component, as opposed to the standard RGB color space used by most color televisions.

Aquos televisions run a Linux-based operating system.  Sharp's SmartLink technology was incorporated into the Aquos LC-15L1U-S.

From 2015 to 2018, Sharp-branded TVs sold in the United States were made by Chinese manufacturer Hisense. In 2019, Sharp regained its licensing and brand, buying back its assets from Hisense. Sharp-manufactured Sharp TVs have been back on the market since late 2019.

Mergers and acquisitions 
In 2015, Sharp's North America TV business was sold to China based Hisense, allowing them to sell TVs in the United States. The intention to acquire was announced in July 2015. Sharp Corporation was subsequently acquired by Taiwan based Foxconn in August, 2016. In 2017, the new owner of Sharp, Foxconn filed a lawsuit against Hisense concerning quality of TVs sold under its Sharp branding citing the TVs "violate FCC rules on electromagnetic interference emissions, and [...] Hisense gave consumers deceptive information about picture size, brightness levels and the 4K resolution." This lawsuit was dropped in early 2018.

Between 2015 and 2018, all Sharp brand TVs sold in the United States were made by Chinese manufacturing company Hisense. As of late 2019, Sharp Corporation has regained the license from Hisense and now continue making Sharp branded TVs.

See also
Blue Man Group Sharp Aquos Theatre
TFT LCD
Liquid crystal display television
Digital television
High-definition television
Plasma television

References

External links
http://www.aquos.com
https://web.archive.org/web/20020601204331/http://www.aquos.co.uk/

Aquos
Linux-based devices
Television sets